The 2013 Supersport World Championship was the fifteenth season of the Supersport World Championship—the seventeenth taking into account the two held under the name of Supersport World Series. It began on 24 February at Phillip Island and finished on 20 October at the Circuito de Jerez after 13 rounds.

The season was marred by the death of Italian rider Andrea Antonelli at the Moscow Raceway round.

Race calendar and results
The provisional race schedule was publicly announced by the FIM on 6 October 2012 with thirteen confirmed rounds and one other round pending confirmation. The series will support the Superbike World Championship at every meeting except Mazda Raceway Laguna Seca. On 15 January 2013 the Indian round was moved from 10 March to 17 November. On 8 March 2013, the FIM issued a definitive calendar, confirming rounds at Portimão and Imola that were previously subject to contract, as well as introducing a round at Istanbul Park in September to complete a 14-round calendar. On 14 August 2013, the Indian round was cancelled due to "operational challenges" at the Buddh International Circuit.

Footnotes

Championship standings

Riders' championship

Manufacturers' championship

Entry list

All entries used Pirelli tyres.

References

External links

World
Supersport World Championship seasons
World